Elections to City of Lincoln Council in Lincolnshire, England, were held on 2 May 2002. One third of the council was up for election and the Labour Party stayed in overall control of the council.

After the election, the composition of the council was:
Labour 27
Conservative 6

Election result

Ward results

Abbey

Birchwood

Boultham

Bracebridge

Carholme

Castle

Glebe

Hartsholme

Minster

Moorland

Park

By-elections between 2002 and 2003

References

2002 English local elections
2002
2000s in Lincolnshire